Helga Lindner (later Härtel; 5 May 1951 – 3 November 2021) was a German swimmer. Born in Karl-Marx-Stadt, East Germany, she competed for East Germany in the 1968 Summer Olympics.

In 1968 she won a silver medal in the women's 200 m butterfly. Dutch competitor Ada Kok won the gold by one-tenth of a second, then the smallest unit of time in the Olympic swimming contests. She also competed in the 100 m butterfly and, as part of a team of four which included Uta Schmuck, the 4 × 100 m medley relay. The East German team came in fifth.

She participated in the 1970 European Aquatics Championships in Barcelona. She and three other swimmers (as a team) from East Germany won a gold medal in the women's 4×100 m medley relay. She personally won a gold medal in the women's 200 m butterfly. She also won a silver medal in the women's 100 m butterfly.

She later competed for East Germany in the 1972 Summer Olympics, but did not win any medals. She was part of the 200 m butterfly event.

Lindner died on 3 November 2021, at the age of 70.

References

External links
 
 

1951 births
2021 deaths
East German female swimmers
Olympic swimmers of East Germany
Swimmers at the 1968 Summer Olympics
Swimmers at the 1972 Summer Olympics
Olympic silver medalists for East Germany
Sportspeople from Chemnitz
Female butterfly swimmers
European Aquatics Championships medalists in swimming
Medalists at the 1968 Summer Olympics
Olympic silver medalists in swimming